Filip Bonačić (27 January 1911 – 30 May 1991) was a Croatian water polo player. He competed in the men's tournament at the 1936 Summer Olympics.

References

External links
 

1911 births
1991 deaths
Croatian male water polo players
Olympic water polo players of Yugoslavia
Water polo players at the 1936 Summer Olympics
Water polo players from Split, Croatia